Grandmasters is a collaborative studio album by American Los Angeles-based record producer DJ Muggs and New York-based rapper GZA. It was released on October 25, 2005 via Angeles Records, serving as Muggs' first in his "DJ Muggs vs." series and GZA's fifth album. Produced entirely by Muggs, it features fellow Wu-Tang Clan members and affiliates Raekwon, RZA, Masta Killa and Prodigal Sunn, as well as Cypress Hill's Sen Dog. The project has a theme of chess as can be seen by the track names. Introductions featuring chess strategy, including instruction for a chess opening using algebraic notation, are within the album. The album was also released in 'Instrumentals' and 'Remix' versions. The latter containing a bonus DVD featuring world tour and studio footage.

Background

Track listing

Personnel 
Gary Grice – main artist, vocals
Lawrence Muggerud – main artist, keyboards (track 3), producer
Corey Woods – featured artist (tracks: 3, 6)
Robert Diggs – featured artist (tracks: 6, 8)
Senen Reyes – featured artist (track 6)
Elgin Turner – featured artist (track 9)
Vergil Ruff – featured artist (track 9)
Dina Nadezhdina – voice (spoken word interludes)
Ina Williams – backing vocals (track 7)
Mike "Crazy Neck" Sims – guitar (tracks: 2, 12), piano (tracks: 4, 7), bass (tracks: 10, 11), keyboards (tracks: 10, 12)
Daniel Seeff – bass (tracks: 2, 6, 7, 9)
Rob Hill – guitar & strings (track 3), mixing
Dontae Winslow – trumpet (track 7)
Ernesto "Ern Dog" Medina – guitar (track 11), bass & organ (track 12), assistant engineering
Joe "The Butcher" Nicolo – mixing
Tyler Nicolo – assistant mixing
DJ SPR4 – recording, assistant mixing
Brian "Big Bass" Gardner – mastering
Mike "Fatoe" Orduña – art direction, design
Joey Castillo Jr. – art direction, design
Robert Johnson III – photography

Charts

References

External links

GZA albums
2005 albums
DJ Muggs albums
Collaborative albums
Albums produced by DJ Muggs